is a railway station in the city of  Tahara, Aichi Prefecture, Japan, operated by the  Public–private partnership Toyohashi Railroad.

Lines
Kambe Station is a station of the Atsumi Line, and is located 17.1 kilometers from the starting point of the line at Shin-Toyohashi Station.

Station layout
The station has two opposed side platforms connected by a level crossing. The station is unattended.

Platforms

Adjacent stations

|-
!colspan=5|Toyohashi Railroad

Station history
Kambe Signal Stop was established on the privately held Atsumi Railroad on September 1, 1930, where a freight spur line extended from the Atsumi Railroad tracks to a cement plant operated by Onoda Cement. The Atsumi Railroad was merged into the Nagoya Railroad on September 1, 1940, and the signal stop discontinued in 1944. It was re-opened as a full station on the Toyohashi Railroad on July 10, 1989.

Passenger statistics
In fiscal 2016, the station was used by an average of 88 passengers daily.

Surrounding area
Japan National Route 259

See also
 List of railway stations in Japan

References

External links

Toyohashi Railway Official home page

Railway stations in Aichi Prefecture
Railway stations in Japan opened in 1989
Tahara, Aichi